Kalaleh Airport  is an airport in Kalaleh, Golestan Province, Iran.

Airlines and destinations

References

Airports in Iran
Kalaleh County
Golestan Province
Buildings and structures in Golestan Province
Transportation in Golestan Province